The 2012 Supersport World Championship was the fourteenth season of the Supersport World Championship—the sixteenth taking into account the two held under the name of Supersport World Series. It began on 26 February at Phillip Island and ended on 7 October in Magny-Cours after 13 rounds.

Kenan Sofuoğlu won his third championship after having returned from Moto2.

Race calendar and results
The provisional race schedule was publicly announced by the FIM on 24 September 2011 with thirteen confirmed rounds and two other rounds pending confirmation. Russia appeared for the first time in the calendar with a round at the brand-new Moscow Raceway. The calendar was updated in October 2011 with the confirmation of the Imola round, for a total of thirteen rounds, supporting the Superbike World Championship at every meeting except Miller Motorsports Park.

Championship standings

Riders' standings

Manufacturers' standings

Entry list
 A provisional entry list was released by the Fédération Internationale de Motocyclisme on 18 January 2012.

All entries used Pirelli tyres.

References

External links
Official website

Super
World
Supersport World Championship seasons